Sister Dr. Mona Tyndall (14 April 1921 – 7 June 2000) was a medical doctor and Roman Catholic missionary in Nigeria and Zambia. She was one of the six children of businessman David P. Tyndall and his wife, Sarah Gaynor Tyndall.

Raised in County Dublin, she became a member of the Roman Catholic religious congregation of the Missionary Sisters of the Holy Rosary (MSHR). A missionary in Nigeria and Zambia, she was an active development worker in the early fight against HIV/AIDS through her leadership of Mother & Child Clinics which were supported by the Irish Government's overseas aid programme in Zambia.

Religious profession & medical qualifications
She joined the Holy Rosary Sisters in Killeshandra, County Cavan, in 1940, and after religious profession on 28 August 1942, she later qualified as a medical doctor at University College Dublin. She then went to England and qualified as an obstetrician and gynaecologist.

Missionary life

Nigeria and the Biafran War
She began her missionary life in Africa starting in Nigeria in 1949 where she ministered to the sick and particularly to young mothers. She was very active along with her fellow religious, in caring for the wounded and displaced during the Biafran War which broke out in Nigeria in 1967. Mission hospitals and feeding centers were overwhelmed by the plight of the sick and wounded civilians and soldiers, and she labored to save lives and console homeless orphans. She and others cared for the starving and the dying. Federal Nigerian troops overcame the Biafran secessionist resistance, and took possession of all the Mission stations. 

Sister Mona and her fellow sisters and priests remained at their posts as long as they could until they were arrested and imprisoned, along with their Bishop, Dr. J. Whelan, C.S.Sp. They were reportedly released only through the personal intercession of Pope Paul VI and then deported from Nigeria.

Zambia
The remainder of her missionary life was spent in Zambia, where she worked firstly in Monze Mission Hospital, and later in Lusaka University Teaching Hospital (UTH), after a brief year in the Westminster Pastoral Institute in London. As Consultant Obstetrician/Gynaecologist at Lusaka UTH, she became a national tutor in the sympto-thermal method of family planning. Concerned with hospital overcrowding and high post-natal mortality, she strove to reduce maternal mortality by half in the 1990s, in accordance with the "Health for All" Alma Ata Declaration (1978). In this, she was strongly supported by the Government of Zambia, and attracted funding from Ireland's then-emerging Official Development Assistance.

With official encouragement and Irish aid, she helped establish the first ten maternal health clinics, and the country's first related ambulance service. Overcrowding at UTH was substantially reduced, and the project was expanded throughout the country. She was credited with a major role in setting up a network of rural clinics with trained local personnel, which dispensed natural family planning methods, and eventually raise″d awareness about the dangers of HIV/AIDS. The maternal clinics network was the result of her initiative.

Exemplary influence
She retired from active missionary service and returned to Cavan in 1995, where she became involved with the Cavan Bereavement Group, for which she trained as a counselor and supervisor. She was an acknowledged contributor to Ireland's first White Paper on foreign policy, and is credited with having had an important role in influencing some elements of Ireland's then-emerging overseas development aid policy. She was one of 17 contributors from the public whose written submissions were acknowledged in the policy paper, and lodged in the National Archives of Ireland.

References
Medical Mission Work of the Holy Rosary Sisters, an article by Sister Mary McCartan Morris, M.B., in The Capuchin Annual 1955, published in Church Street, Dublin, 1955.
Challenges and Opportunities Abroad – White Paper on Foreign Policy, published by the Stationery Office for the Department of Foreign Affairs, Government of Ireland, Dublin, 1996 
Obituary: "Death of, Sr. Mona Tyndall", published in Anglo-Celt (25 June 2000)

1921 births
2000 deaths
Irish obstetricians
Irish gynaecologists
Irish Roman Catholic missionaries
People from Glasnevin
Female Roman Catholic missionaries
Irish humanitarians
Place of death missing
20th-century Irish medical doctors
Roman Catholic missionaries in Zambia
Roman Catholic missionaries in Nigeria
Irish expatriates in Nigeria
Irish expatriates in Zambia
Roman Catholic medical missionaries
20th-century Irish nuns
Medical doctors from Dublin (city)
Alumni of University College Dublin